Stefan Bengt Edberg (born 19 January 1966) is a Swedish former professional tennis player. A major proponent of the serve-and-volley style of tennis, he won six Grand Slam singles titles and three Grand Slam men's doubles titles between 1985 and 1996. He is one of only two men in the Open Era to have been ranked world No. 1 in both singles and doubles (the other being John McEnroe). He also won the Masters Grand Prix and was a part of the Swedish Davis Cup-winning team four times. In addition, he won four Masters Series titles, four Championship Series titles and the unofficial 1984 Olympic tournament, was ranked in the singles top 10 for ten successive years, and ranked nine years in the top 5. After retirement, Edberg began coaching Roger Federer in January 2014, with this partnership ending in December 2015.

Career
Edberg first came to the tennis world's attention as a junior player. He won all four Grand Slam junior titles in 1983 to become the first (and only) player to achieve the "Junior Grand Slam" in the open era. Later that year as a professional, Edberg won his first career doubles title in Basel. Edberg accidentally caused the death of linesman Dick Wertheim with an errant serve during the 1983 US Open.

In 1984, Edberg won his first top-level singles title in Milan. Edberg also won the tennis tournament at the 1984 Summer Olympics when the sport was an exhibition event and partnered with fellow Swede Anders Järryd to reach the final of the US Open. Edberg also reached the French Open doubles final with Järryd in 1986 and consequently was world No. 1 in doubles in that year.

U.S. fans first took notice of Edberg's professional career when he won the U.S. Indoor in Memphis in February 1985, defeating Yannick Noah in the final. Edberg's first two Grand Slam singles titles came at the Australian Open. In December 1985, he defeated Mats Wilander in straight sets to claim his first major title. In January 1987, he defended his title by defeating local favourite Pat Cash in five sets to win the last Australian Open held on grass courts. Edberg also won the Australian Open and US Open men's doubles titles in 1987 (partnering fellow Swede Anders Järryd).

In 1988, Edberg reached the first of three consecutive finals at Wimbledon, but lost his ranking as Sweden's number-one-player when Mats Wilander had his best year by winning the Australian, French and US Opens, becoming the world's number-one-ranked player. In all three of his consecutive Wimbledon finals, Edberg played German Boris Becker in what became one of Wimbledon's greatest rivalries. Edberg won their first encounter in a four-set match spread over two days because of rain delays. A year later, Becker won in straight sets. The closest of their matches came in the 1990 final, when Edberg won in five sets after being down a break in the fifth set.

Edberg reached the French Open final in 1989 but lost in five sets to 17-year-old Michael Chang, who became the youngest-ever male winner of a Grand Slam singles title. This was the only Grand Slam singles title that Edberg never won, denying him the completion of a career Grand Slam at the senior level, to match his junior Grand Slam.

In 1990, an abdominal muscle injury forced Edberg to retire from the Australian Open final while trailing Ivan Lendl 5–2 (including two breaks of serve) in the third set. Edberg nevertheless took the world No. 1 ranking from Lendl on 13 August 1990 by winning the Super 9 tournament in Cincinnati. He held it for the rest of that year and for much of 1991 and 1992. Edberg spent a total of 72 weeks as World No. 1. In 1991, Edberg again reached the semifinals of Wimbledon but lost to Michael Stich in a close match: 6–4, 6–7, 6–7, 6–7.

Edberg's final two Grand Slam singles triumphs came at the US Open, with wins over Jim Courier in the 1991 final and Pete Sampras (who was just months away from attaining the world No. 1 ranking) in the 1992 final.

Edberg reached the finals of the Australian Open again in 1992 and 1993, losing both times to Jim Courier in four sets. He was one of the few players who reached the finals of the Australian Open five times. The 1993 Australian Open final was Edberg's last Grand Slam singles final appearance.

In 1996, Edberg reached the finals of Queens Club but lost the match to Boris Becker. He won his third and final Grand Slam doubles title at the Australian Open with Petr Korda. He reached the quarterfinals of his last US Open after defeating Richard Krajicek and Tim Henman, but lost in the quarterfinals to Goran Ivanišević.

Edberg was most comfortable playing tennis on fast-playing surfaces. Of his six Grand Slam singles titles, four were won on grass courts at the Australian Open (1985 and 1987) and Wimbledon (1988 and 1990) and two were won on hardcourts at the US Open (1991 and 1992).

In December 2013, Edberg began coaching Roger Federer. His coaching stint ended in December 2015 after which Federer hired Ivan Ljubičić as coach.

Style of play
Edberg is noted as one of the finest serve-and-volley players of his era. Edberg did not possess a powerful dominating serve like Pete Sampras or Boris Becker, but his serve was still largely effective. Edberg often chose to use a less powerful serve, such as a kick or slice serve. The extra time from using a slower serve gave Edberg more time to get to the net, where he used his quick feet and athleticism to gain control of the point. Edberg's volleying skills were among the very best and he could easily redirect powerfully struck balls to the open court. He had sufficient groundstrokes, and his one-handed backhand was one of his marquee shots. Edberg's backhand was extremely effective and considered amongst the best of his era.

Equipment
Throughout his career, Edberg used Wilson racquets and Adidas clothing and shoes.

Post-career competitive racquet sports
Edberg began playing competitive squash after his retirement from professional tennis and soon became an elite player in Sweden.  When racketlon emerged as a growing sport in Scandinavia, Edberg's pro-level tennis ability and emerging squash prowess made him highly competitive, despite his relative inexperience in badminton and table tennis.

In September 2008, Stefan Edberg officially joined the "Black Rock Tour of Champions", a tour for professional tennis players who have retired from the ATP Tour. Edberg won his first tournament in Paris held on clay, winning matches against clay court specialists Thomas Muster in the opening round and Sergi Bruguera in the finals.

In January 2012, Edberg played a one-set exhibition against Jo-Wilfried Tsonga in Doha, Qatar, and lost 5–7.

Coaching
Edberg signed a contract to become Roger Federer's coach at the end of 2013. Their collaboration officially started at the 2014 Australian Open.  Federer described Edberg's role as "more of a mentor than a coach"; nonetheless, his influence has been widely regarded as pivotal in the Swiss champion's eventual resurgence, especially in bringing effective and more frequent serve-and-volley and net charging to his game. Their collaboration ended in December 2015.

Distinctions and honors
 Edberg played on four Swedish Davis Cup winning teams in 1984, 1985, 1987 and 1994. He appeared in seven Davis Cup finals – a record for a Swedish player.
 Until 2016, the Australian Open logo was a silhouette of Stefan Edberg's unique service action. It was then changed to the current logo to make it more friendly for the digital medium.
 Since the Association of Tennis Professionals (ATP) computer rankings began, Edberg and John McEnroe are the only men to be ranked world No. 1 in both singles and doubles. Edberg is also the only player to achieve the "Junior Grand Slam" in the history of the game.
 Edberg is the only player to earn both Player of the Year and Doubles Team of the Year. Edberg won Player of the Year in 1990 and 1991 and Doubles Team of the Year (with fellow Swede Anders Järryd) in 1986.
 Edberg and Boris Becker are the only male tennis players ever to receive the United Press International Athlete of the Year Award (with Edberg having received the award in 1990).
 Edberg was also a member of the Swedish teams that won the World Team Cup in 1988, 1991, and 1995.
 At the 1984 Olympic Games in Los Angeles, where tennis was a demonstration sport, Edberg won the men's singles gold medal. Four years later, at the 1988 Olympics in Seoul, tennis became a full medal sport and Edberg won bronze medals in both the men's singles and the men's doubles.
 During his career, Edberg won a total of 41 top-level singles titles (6 majors) and 18 doubles titles (3 majors) and appeared in a then record 54 consecutive Grand Slam tournaments (since then broken by Wayne Ferreira).
 He was ranked the world no. 1 in singles for a total of 72 weeks.
 Edberg was a five-time recipient of the ATP Sportsmanship Award (1988–90, 1992, and 1995). In recognition of this achievement, the ATP renamed the award the Stefan Edberg Sportsmanship Award in 1996.
 In 1996, Edberg won the Philippe Chatrier Award for his contribution to tennis both on and off the court.
 Edberg won the International Club's prestigious Jean Borotra Sportsmanship Award in 1998. 
 In 2004, Edberg was inducted into the International Tennis Hall of Fame in Newport, Rhode Island, United States.
 Edberg won singles titles in 12 countries: Australia, France, Germany, Italy, Japan, Netherlands, Qatar, Spain, Sweden, Switzerland, the United Kingdom, and the United States.
 In 2008, Edberg was considered by Tennis Magazine to be the 14th greatest player, counting both male and female tennis players, of the Tennis Era. Counting men only, Edberg ranked eighth.
 Edberg was awarded the Svenska Dagbladet Gold Medal in 1990.
 Edberg is one of the few players who reached the final of all four Grand Slam tournaments, winning three of them. In the 1989 French Open final, Edberg led the match by two sets to one over Michael Chang and broke Chang's serve in the opening game of the fourth set, only for Chang to break right back. From 1–1 to 4–4 in the fourth set, every Chang service game was a struggle where Chang had to save 11 break points while Edberg held comfortably in his service games. At 5–4 to Chang in the fourth set, Chang broke Edberg's serve completely against the run of play to win the set. Edberg was also a break up early in the fifth set, but Chang won the fifth set 6–2 to take the title at the age of 17.
 Edberg won several Grand Slam matches after being down a break of serve in the fifth and deciding set. Notable examples include the 1985 Australian Open semi final against Ivan Lendl, the 1988 Wimbledon semi final against Miloslav Mečíř, the 1989 French Open semi final against Boris Becker, and the 1990 Wimbledon final against Becker. In the 1992 US Open, Edberg won from a break down in the fifth set in three consecutive matches, against Richard Krajicek in the fourth round, Ivan Lendl in the quarter final, and Michael Chang in the semi final. In all of these tournaments, with the exception of the 1989 French Open, Edberg went on to win the tournament.

Personal life
Edberg was born in Västervik, Sweden. He is married to Annette Hjort Olsen, whom he married in April 1992. They have two children, Emilie and Christopher. Olsen was previously in a relationship with Edberg's tennis rival Mats Wilander before her relationship with Edberg began in 1985.

Edberg is a supporter of English football team Leeds United and the Swedish ice hockey team Växjö Lakers.

Career statistics

Grand Slam tournament timeline

Records
 These records were attained in Open Era of tennis.
 Records in bold indicate peer-less achievements.

Place in history
Edberg is considered by many to be one of the greatest tennis players of his era. In his home country, together with Mats Wilander, he is commonly regarded as the best Swedish tennis player after Björn Borg.

Professional awards
 ITF World Champion: 1991
 ATP Player of the Year: 1990, 1991

See also

 Becker–Edberg rivalry
 Edberg–Lendl rivalry
 Tennis male players statistics
 World number 1 male tennis player rankings
 List of Swedish sportspeople

References

External links

 
 
 
 

1966 births
Living people
Australian Open (tennis) champions
Australian Open (tennis) junior champions
French Open junior champions
International Tennis Hall of Fame inductees
Olympic bronze medalists for Sweden
Olympic medalists in tennis
Olympic tennis players of Sweden
People from Växjö 
People from Västervik Municipality
Swedish male tennis players
Tennis players at the 1984 Summer Olympics
Tennis players at the 1988 Summer Olympics
Tennis players at the 1992 Summer Olympics
US Open (tennis) champions
US Open (tennis) junior champions
Wimbledon champions
Wimbledon junior champions
Grand Slam (tennis) champions in men's singles
Grand Slam (tennis) champions in men's doubles
Medalists at the 1988 Summer Olympics
Swedish tennis coaches
Grand Slam (tennis) champions in boys' singles
ATP number 1 ranked singles tennis players
ATP number 1 ranked doubles tennis players
ITF World Champions
Sportspeople from Kronoberg County